Limkain-b1 is a protein that in humans is encoded by the KIAA0430 gene.

References

Further reading

External links 
 PDBe-KB provides an overview of all the structure information available in the PDB for Human Meiosis regulator and mRNA stability factor 1 (KIAA0430)